Ecpetala is a genus of moths in the family Geometridae. It was described by David Stephen Fletcher in 1958.

References
 

Larentiinae